Laidcenn mac Bairchid, or Laidcenn mac Bairceda, is said to have been an early Irish language poet, whose floruit, if he existed, may have fallen in the middle of the 5th century.

According to later glosses, he belonged to the Cruthin of Dál nAraidi in Ulster, a claim which may well be incorrect. A poem on the Kings of Leinster included in the Corpus genealogiarum Hiberniae is attributed to him, but Kuno Meyer considered the attribution to be certainly false and the poem is dated to the 7th century.

Laidcenn's poem, if indeed it is his, provides a very different list of kings to that contained in the Book of Leinster, probably intended to support the claims of the Uí Bairrche to the primacy in Leinster.

References

Further reading

5th-century Irish poets
Irish male poets